The  was a title used on the Japanese independent circuit. The title was the world heavyweight championship of the International Wrestling Association of Japan (IWA Japan).

Title history

IWA World Heavyweight Championship

IWA Triple Crown Championship

Footnotes

See also
International Wrestling Association of Japan
Super Asia Championship

References

World heavyweight wrestling championships
International Wrestling Association of Japan